Burton Borough School (often abbreviated as 'BBS') is a coeducational secondary school situated on the southern edge of Newport, Shropshire, England, in Audley Avenue. The school was opened in 1957 and since then has developed steadily. In September 2004 it was designated a Specialist Arts College.

The school is named after a local man J.S. Burton Borough, who was a High Sheriff and deputy lieutenant for Shropshire and was the first governor of the school.

Development
Over the last ten years the school has grown due to the growth of Newport, the school went from 800 to 1,300 pupils and has had to expand and modernise the building.

The first large piece of building work was in 1999 when it was decided to expand the music department, by building a new complex fitted with art gallery, large music rooms, small rooms for 'one to one' development, a theatre and external theatre, plus a recording studio.

With the new pupils, the school received additional funding from the government, which the school decided to spend developing the English department, by building a new block made up of five new classrooms, this development went alongside the new gym and sports hall which was built next to the Army Cadet Force hut.

The school was awarded a 'good' Ofsted report in March 2013.

The school has built a reputation for its music and its Concert Band and Big Band have won numerous awards and competed in national and international competitions. They consistently win the top awards at the national concert band festivals.

Further plans
In March 2014 construction work started behind the current main building of a new teaching block which has replaced a number of the current classrooms, which completed for the start of term in September 2015. This was funded through the UK government's Building Schools for the Future programme.

New school building
The new school building, which lies behind the concurrent building, was completed in June 2015. The building is modern, contemporary and much more suited to the greater supply of pupils. The vast central space of the building is open plan and it connects directly to the (original) English block, now the Maths block. Within the new building is a library, unisex toilets and approximately 30 new classrooms: including a design and technology block, a large meeting room, STEM and COMMS classrooms and various ICT suites throughout the building.

Notable former pupils
Ricky Bailey - professional rugby league footballer for St. Helens
Shaun Bailey- Member of Parliament for West Bromwich West 
David Johnson -  Former Jamaica, Ipswich Town and Nottingham Forest footballer
Philip Oliver - English cricketer for Shropshire, Staffordshire and Warwickshire.
David Pallett - English Darts Player
Adam Proudlock - Former Wolves, Ipswich Town and Nottingham Forest footballer
James Sutton - TV actor best known for starring in Hollyoaks and Emmerdale
Jason Weaver - English cricketer for Shropshire

References

External links
School Website

Secondary schools in Telford and Wrekin
Newport, Shropshire
Buildings and structures in Newport, Shropshire
Community schools in Telford and Wrekin
Educational institutions established in 1957
1957 establishments in England